John Page (April 28, 1743October 11, 1808) was an American politician. He served in the U.S. Congress and as the 13th Governor of Virginia.

Early life 

Page was born and lived at Rosewell Plantation in Gloucester County. He was the son of Alice (Grymes) and Mann Page. His great-great-grandfather was Colonel John Page (1628–1692), an English merchant from Middlesex who emigrated to Virginia with his wife Alice Lucken Page and settled in Middle Plantation. He was the brother of Mann Page III.

John Page graduated from the College of William and Mary in 1763, where he was a close friend and college classmate of Thomas Jefferson, with whom he exchanged, as fellow revolutionaries, much correspondence.

Career

Officer

After he graduated from William and Mary, he then served under George Washington in an expedition during the French and Indian War. He also served during the American Revolutionary War as an officer in the Virginia state militia, raising a regiment from Gloucester County and supplementing it with personal funds. During that war, he attained the rank of colonel.

Planter
Page inherited wealth, including Rosewell plantation, but lacked business success as a planter, so after his death, when his debts became due, his family was forced to sell the plantation

Politician
Page was a Fifth Virginia Convention delegate in 1776. Page was also instrumental in getting his wife Frances' brother, Nathaniel Burwell, appointed to the Governor's council, and together, Page and Burwell opposed Lord Dunmore's proclamation against Patrick Henry. Page and Burwell built the council whose membership read like a list of Patriots, shaping the American Revolution against Britain.

The revolutionary Virginia legislature elected Page as the Lieutenant Governor of Virginia and served 1776–1779. Gloucester County voters elected him and Thomas Smith as their representatives in the new Virginia House of Delegates 1781–1783 and re=elected the pair three times to the one-year, part-time position until electing James Hubard to replace Page in 1784, only to reelect Page with Smith's namesake son, who served 1785 – 1788. However, when voters were asked to select delegates to the Virginia Ratifying Convention of 1788, they chose Warner Lewis alongside Thomas Smith, rather than this man. Nonetheless, the Page family remained politically powerful in Gloucester County, as voters elected Mann Page to succeed him for a term. However, they selected Mordecai Cooke and James Baytop, who became their repeatedly reelected delegates in Richmond.

Following ratification of the federal constitution, Page successfully ran for a seat in the First United States Congress and was reelected to the Second and Third, and to the Fourth as a member of the Democratic-Republican Party after that party had been created by Thomas Jefferson and James Madison. He was a Congressman from March 4, 1789, to March 3, 1797. He was elected a member of the American Philosophical Society in 1792.

After his terms in Congress, Page again won election as one of Gloucester County's representatives to the  Virginia House of Delegates in 1797, alongside William Hall. However, only Hall won re-election in 1798, as Mordecai Cooke and several other men won the second seat.  In 1800, Gloucester County voters again selected Page to sit alongside Hall and reelected neither, presumably in part because fellow legislators elected Page as Governor of Virginia. 

Page became the Governor of Virginia in 1802 and served until 1805. After his term ended (since the state constitution forbade re-election), Page accepted a federal appointment as United States commissioner of loans for Virginia and held office until his death.

Personal life

In 1765, Page married Frances Burwell (1745–1784), daughter of Col. Robert "Robin" Burwell. Together, Frances and John were the parents of twelve children, though only seven lived to adulthood: Mann (1766-1813), Robert (1770-?), Sally (1771-?), Alice (1775-?), Frances (1777-?), Francis (1781-?), and Judith (1783-?).  Of the seven who survived to adulthood, five married children of Gov. Thomas Nelson, thereby forging a significant alliance between the Page and Nelson families, there was also Burwell blood on both sides, the Burwells by these marriages becoming close relatives of the Page and Nelson families for at least three generations.

After the death of his first wife in 1784, Page remarried, this time to early American poet Margaret Lowther Page (1759–1835), who hosted a vibrant literary salon at the Rosewell Plantation. Page, himself also a poet, wrote several poems about national political issues, including Shays' Rebellion and the Virginia Religious Disestablishment Act (Virginia Statute for Religious Freedom). He and Margaret were parents to eight children. However, only three lived to see adulthood: Margaret (1790-?), Barbara(1795-?), and Lucy (1807-?). Page's niece by marriage, Judith Lomax, was also a poet.

Page died in Richmond, Virginia, on October 11, 1808. He was interred in St. John's Churchyard in Richmond.

Legacy
The Page family is one of the First Families of Virginia. Its members include Colonel John Page, Governor John Page, his brother Mann Page, Thomas Nelson Page a leading proponent of the Lost Cause myth, and Virginian Railway builder William Nelson Page.

Page County, Virginia, located in the Shenandoah Valley, was formed in 1831 and named for Governor John Page. Also bearing his name is a residence hall at the College of William and Mary.

Governor Page was quoted by George W. Bush in his inaugural address in 2001. Writing to his friend Jefferson shortly after the Declaration of Independence was published, Page said of the Declaration and the Revolution: "We know the race is not to the swift nor the battle to the strong. Do you not think an angel rides in the whirlwind and directs this storm".

Electoral history

1789; Page was elected to the U.S. House of Representatives, defeating Spencer Roane and Meriwether Smith
1790; Page was re-elected unopposed.

See also
 John Page (Middle Plantation)
 Mann Page, Rosewell (plantation)

References

External links
A Guide to the Governor John Page Executive Papers, 1802–1805 at The Library of Virginia

1743 births
1808 deaths
College of William & Mary alumni
Governors of Virginia
Members of the Virginia House of Delegates
House of Burgesses members
People from Gloucester County, Virginia
Politicians from Richmond, Virginia
Virginia militiamen in the American Revolution
John Page
American people of English descent
Democratic-Republican Party members of the United States House of Representatives from Virginia
Democratic-Republican Party state governors of the United States
18th-century American politicians
19th-century American politicians
Virginia colonial people